La Panadería (in English: The Bakery) was a contemporary art gallery located in Mexico City founded in 1994 by artists Yoshua Okón and Miguel Calderón. It represented a singular role in the artistic creation of Mexico in the late nineties due host and promote expressions traditionally relegated from institutional circuits. La Panadería become a reference point for the creative community in the city due to its alternative vocation.

Established in an old bakery, hosted early work from artists such as Carlos Amorales, Gabriel Orozco or SEMEFO project. In addition to the exhibition space for artistic expression in different disciplines, La Panadería had a residency program for foreign artists. Until 2002 the gallery was located at 159 Amsterdam Avenue in Colonia Condesa.

References

Contemporary art galleries in Mexico
Art galleries established in 1994
1994 establishments in Mexico
Art museums and galleries in Mexico
Artist-run centres